Senator Mullin may refer to:

Joseph Mullin (state senator) (1848–1897), New York State Senate
Kevin J. Mullin (born 1958), Vermont State Senate
Markwayne Mullin (born 1977), U.S. Senator from Oklahoma

See also
Senator Mullan (disambiguation)